Sun sign astrology, or star sign astrology, is a modern simplified system of Western astrology which considers only the position of the Sun at birth, which is said to be placed within one of the twelve zodiac signs, rather than the positions of the sun and the other six 'planets'. This sign is then called the sun sign or star sign of the person born in that twelfth-part of the year. Sun sign astrologers take this basic twelve-fold division and relate all the current movements of all the planets to each other, using traditional rules to divine meanings for each sign separately. Because the Moon has the fastest apparent movement of all the heavenly bodies, it is often used as the main indicator of daily trends for sun sign astrology forecasts.

Each Sun sign is composed of 30 degrees (0-29), which make up the circle, so people born near the end of a sign may need to mathematically re-calculate their chart.

Sun sign astrology is a pseudoscience
and the form of astrology most commonly found in many newspaper and magazine columns. Scientific investigations of the theoretical basis and experimental verification of claims have shown it to have no scientific validity or explanatory power.

History
Although William Lilly in the 17th century was the first newspaper astrologer, it isn't known exactly when sun sign astrology first began. However, it was largely popularized by horoscopes which began appearing in English newspapers in the 1930s. Astrologer R. H. Naylor was claimed to have accurately predicted events surrounding the birth of Princess Margaret and the crash of the R101 airship in his horoscopes featured in The Sunday Express. By 1937, Naylor began writing a regular column for the paper called Your Stars, which featured horoscopes based on the 12 star signs.

Sun signs
The following table shows the zodiac names in Latin, with their English translation and the individuals' names. It also shows the element and quality associated with each sign. The starting and ending dates of the sun sign are approximate, as they may differ from one year to another (by a day or so), due to the fact that the earth's orbit around the sun is not synchronous with earth's rotation (one year does not comprehend a whole number of days). [{cite web| https://www.blogger.com/blog/post/edit/23268590780771270/5195281439054619182?hl=en-GB}] |title= What Are the Real Dates for Astrology Signs? |date=2023-03-12 |accessdate=2012-04-23}}</ref> The exact date and time of sign entrance/exit (which is corresponded to the 12 "mid-climates" within Chinese lunisolar calendar) must be obtained with appropriate software or with the help of an ephemeris.

Traditional planets in brackets

See also
Sun sign
Horoscopic astrology
Horoscope
Acronical place

References 

Astrology by type
History of astrology
Astrology